Julio César Moreno Yáñez (born 27 September 1969) is a Football Manager.

Career
As a young football player, Moreno was with Universidad Católica, until he was invited to play outside Chile by his friends. So, he played football in Indonesia for Arema Malang, where he coincided with his compatriots Nelson León Sánchez and Juan Rodríguez Rubio, Malaysia, Singapore and Australia. Once in Sydney, he studied football analytics at university level, where he met Bora Milutinović.

He is the former assistant coach of Iraq national football team, previously he was the head coach of Hong Kong First Division League side Kitchee.

He is former's assistant of Bora Milutinović. He follows Milutinović to Iraq national football team in May 2009 until June 2009. Moreno has been comparts with Milutinovic in 2009 FIFA Confederations Cup. In the winter of 2010, he was recruited as a coach by Serbia's national team coach Radomir Antić, with whom he has been helping plan out strategies and analysis for the games and matches.

He has developed a close friendship with the Chile international footballer Arturo Vidal.

Managerial career
Assistant Coach Bora Milutinovic
National Team China
January 2000 – June 2003 
First and only time classified to the World Cup 2002

Assistant Coach Bora Milutinovic
National Team Honduras
September 2003 – June 2004 
Qualifiers 2006 World Cup in Germany

Assistant Coach Bora Milutinovic
Al Sadd
July 2004 – December 2005 
Emir of Qatar Cup Champions

Head Coach L'Entente SSG
January 2006 – November 2006

Assistant Coach Luis Fernandez
Real Betis Balompie
December 2006 – July 2007 
Objective Completed, maintain category of the club in the first division. 
Quarter-finals of Copa del Rey

Assistant Coach Bora Milutinovic
National Team Jamaica
August 2007 – March 2008

Head Coach of Hong Kong First Division League side Kitchee
Kitchee F.C.
May 2008 – March 2009 
Head Coach 2009, National Team Hong Kong, Lunar New Year Cup 2009

Assistant Coach Bora Milutinovic
National Team Iraq
April 2009 – August 2009 
Participated in the FIFA Confederations Cup 2009

Assistant Coach Radomir Antic
National Team Serbia
December 2009 – September 2010 
Participated in the FIFA World Cup 2010

Incorporation to The Group Qatar bid 2022
September 2010

Supported National Team Qatar U-20
January 2011 – December 2012

Head Coach National Team Qatar U-23 (Olympic Team)
March 2013

Head Coach Guangdong Sunray Cave (China)
April 2013 – May 2014

 Assistant Coach Al Rayyan Qatar 
June 2015 - September 2016

 Assistant Coach National Team Qatar 
October 2016 – December 2018
             
 Analyst  National Team Thailand
December 2018 – February 2019

References

External links
 Julio César Moreno at PlaymakerStats

1969 births
Living people
Footballers from Santiago
Chilean footballers
Chilean expatriate footballers
Club Deportivo Universidad Católica footballers
Arema F.C. players
Chilean Primera División players
Indonesian Premier Division players
Expatriate footballers in Indonesia
Expatriate footballers in Malaysia
Expatriate footballers in Singapore
Expatriate soccer players in Australia
Chilean expatriate sportspeople in Indonesia
Chilean expatriate sportspeople in Malaysia
Chilean expatriate sportspeople in Singapore
Chilean expatriate sportspeople in Australia
Association football midfielders
Chilean football managers
Chilean expatriate football managers
Entente SSG managers
Kitchee SC managers
Expatriate football managers in China
Expatriate football managers in Honduras
Expatriate football managers in Qatar
Expatriate football managers in France
Expatriate football managers in Spain
Expatriate football managers in Jamaica
Expatriate football managers in Hong Kong
Expatriate football managers in Iraq
Expatriate football managers in Serbia
Expatriate football managers in Thailand
Chilean expatriate sportspeople in China
Chilean expatriate sportspeople in Honduras
Chilean expatriate sportspeople in Qatar
Chilean expatriate sportspeople in France
Chilean expatriate sportspeople in Spain
Chilean expatriate sportspeople in Jamaica
Chilean expatriate sportspeople in Hong Kong
Chilean expatriate sportspeople in Iraq
Chilean expatriate sportspeople in Serbia
Chilean expatriate sportspeople in Thailand